Warren J. Winstead (November 10, 1927 – December 3, 2001) was an American academic, and was the first president of Nova Southeastern University. Winstead graduated from Harvard University with a PhD.  (NSU says "He obtained his B.A. and M.S. from the University of Richmond. He later obtained a C.A.S. and Ed.D. from Harvard University.")  He became the President of Nova Southeastern University in 1964 and was president until 1970.

References

1927 births
2001 deaths
Harvard Graduate School of Education alumni
Presidents of Nova Southeastern University
University of Richmond alumni
20th-century American academics